Seiuemon Inaba (1925-2020) was a Japanese roboticist who was the founder and honorary chairman of FANUC. Inaba was born in 1925 in Ibaraki Prefecture, north of Tokyo. Inaba played a key role in the development of the robot industry.

In 1992, he was elected a member of the National Academy of Engineering for pioneering achievements in numerically controlled machine tools and factory automation and contributions to engineering research and education.

Inaba died on October 2, 2020, at the age of 95.

Biography 
 1946: Bachelor of Engineering from University of Tokyo
 1946: Joined Fujitsu
 1956: Introduced efficient and accurate servo control methods for numerical control
 1965: Ph.D. in engineering from the Tokyo Institute of Technology
 1972: Founded and served as Executive Director of Fujitsu Fanuc, which later becomes FANUC Corporation
 1975: Served as first President of FANUC
 1995: Honorary Chairman of FANUC

Awards and honors 
 2005: IEEE Robotics and Automation Award

References

1925 births
2020 deaths
Japanese roboticists